Catholic University of Brasília (UCB) is a private, non-profit, Roman Catholic university located in Taguatinga, in  the Federal District, in Brazil. As the only private university in the Federal District, it ranks sixth in the list of private institutions in Brazil. It is maintained by the Catholic Archdiocese of Brasília.

History 
The Catholic School of Humanities was founded in 1974, and offered courses in business administration, economics, and education, to fulfill the educational needs of the residents settled in the new capital. History of the university is linked to the creation of Brasília during the 1950s, when the capital was moved from Rio de Janeiro to a more central location. Brasília became a major growth hub in the country.

Number of courses being offered at the first private college of the capital (the Catholic School of Humanities) increased over the years, and the university was renamed in 1980 as the Catholic Integrated College of Brasília (FICB). Towards the end of 1994, it was once again renamed as the Catholic University of Brasilia - UCB, by the Federal Education Council through the Ministerial Decree 1.827 of December 28. The Catholic University of Brasília - UCB is the only private university in the Federal District, and ranks sixth in the list of private institutions in Brazil.

Schools, faculties and institutes 
UCB has three campuses: Campus I (the main Campus) is located in the Taguatinga. Campus II, namely Asa Norte, and Campus III, or Asa Sul, are located in the Brasília. The university is associated with three units in Asa Sul - Dom Bosco School, CEMA, and Pius XII - which along with Universa Foundation, offer most of the Graduate "Lato Sensu" Courses.The Hospital of the Catholic University of Brasília (HUCB) is also located in Taguatinga.

Main academic units of UCB include the Library System – SIBI - which is responsible for five physical libraries and a virtual library with more than 100,000 titles and 218,000 volumes. It also includes Software Sections (22) of which seven are public, Publisher Universa, 147 laboratories, HUCB – Hospital of the Catholic University of Brasilia - Catholic Online and Distance Education Centre – LCC / EAD. These offer postgraduate "Lato Sensu" degrees, undergraduate (bachelor's and licentiate) degrees, extension programs and feature 25 poles, of which 21 are located in Brazil, 3 are in Japan and 1 is in Angola.

Altogether UCB has an area of about 620.000m² and approximately 116.000m² of its campus is built around the Federal District (Campus I, CAAN, CAAS, HUCB and associated units) area.

The main Campus of UCB features 6 Schools which are:

 School of Health
Offers 16 courses (7 Bachelors, 2 Bachelors / Undergraduate, 1 Technological Distance Course, 3 Master's degrees and 3 Doctorate Degrees)

 Polytechnic School
Offers 13 courses (5 Bachelors, 3 Technological Degrees, 3 Technological Distance Courses and 2 Masters)

 School of Business
Offers 21 courses (6 Bachelors, 3 Bachelors distance courses, 4 Technological Courses, 5 Technological Distance Courses, 2 Masters and 1 PhD)

 School of Education and Humanities
Offers 12 courses (6 Undergraduate Degrees, 1 Bachelor, 3 Distance courses, 1 Masters and 1 Doctorate in Education)

 School of Medicine
Offers 2 courses (one Bachelor and one master's degree)

 School of Law
Offers 4 courses (1 Bachelor, 2 Technological Distance Courses and 1 Master)

Education 
In addition to normal classroom courses, the university also offers a distance education program. Number of students enrolled in all distance education courses was 1,869 in 2003, and rose to 3,283 in 2006, a 75% increase. Until 2006, the university offered eight undergraduate courses and seven postgraduate courses as part of its distance-learning module. In the later years, the online course curriculum was expanded with the help of the International Covenants on Centers for Distance Education, or PEADs.

Today, the university offers 34 undergraduate degree courses, 27 graduate courses, 6 MBA programs and 5 Doctoral graduate courses.  

According to the Student April Editor's Guide 2013, 80 stars had been awarded to 22 courses at UCB. The Course of Economics received the highest score, with five stars. Twelve courses received four stars: Management, Accounting, Law (CAAS and Campus I), Physical Education (CAAS and Campus I), Pharmacy, Social Communication (journalism, advertising and marketing), Psychology, International Relations and IT Systems. Seven courses earned three stars: Computer Science, Biological Sciences, Environmental Engineering, Physiotherapy, Nutrition, Dentistry and Pedagogy.

In the 2012 release of the RUF - University Ranking Sheet - UCB occupied the 35th position overall and ranked 6th among all private institutions in Brazil. Likewise, in Pro-Rectory of Postgraduate Studies and Research, number of enrolled students increased by 40% in 2013.

Undergraduate programs
UCB currently offers 53 majors. Undergraduate courses are offered by the university under four major categories:

 Social Sciences
 Business administration
 Political Science and Government
 Accounting
 Economics
 Digital Communication
 Social Communication
 Law
 Philosophy
 Languages
 Pedagogy
 Teacher Training Program
 Psychology
 International Relations
 Bilingual Executive Secretary
 Social Service

 Exact Sciences
 Architecture and Urbanism
 Computer Science
 Environmental Engineering
 Civil Engineering
 Physics
 Mathematics
 Chemistry
 IT Systems
 Technology in Logistics

 Biological Sciences
 Bio-medicine
 Biological Sciences
 Physical Education
 Nursing
 Pharmacy
 Physiotherapy
 Gerontology
 Medicine
 Nutrition
 Dentistry

 Distance Courses
 Bachelor of Arts
 Bachelor of Business Administration
 Bachelor of Science in Accounting
 Degree in Tourism
 Degree in Philosophy
 Degree in Pedagogy
 Educational Training Program 
 Technology in Foreign Trade
 Technology in IT Management 
 Technology in Human Resource Management

References

External links
 Official website (in Portuguese)

Catholic universities and colleges in Brazil
1974 establishments in Brazil
Educational institutions established in 1974
Universities and colleges in Brasília